The Park Lake Historic District, at the junction of Will Rogers Dr. and Lake Dr. in Santa Rosa, New Mexico, is a  historic district which was listed on the National Register of Historic Places in 1996.  The district included one contributing building: a stone storage building, two contributing structures: stone walls and canals, and three contributing sites: a lake, a playing field, and landscaped area surrounding the lake.

References

		
National Register of Historic Places in Guadalupe County, New Mexico
Mission Revival architecture in New Mexico
Buildings and structures completed in 1934
1934 establishments in New Mexico